Nepenthes'' sp. Anipahan is an undescribed tropical pitcher plant known only from Mount Anipahan in central Palawan, the Philippines, where it grows in upper montane forest at 1200–1400 m above sea level.McPherson, S.R. 2011. Comparison of the highland Palaweño Nepenthes. In: New Nepenthes: Volume One. Redfern Natural History Productions, Poole. pp. 364–381. It is very closely allied to N. leonardoi and may be conspecific with it.

References

 Cullen, D. & B. Quinn 2012. Exploring Mount Victoria, Central Palawan – revisiting the habitat of N. attenboroughii. Part 1: Mt Victoria – Peak 1 & 2. Victorian Carnivorous Plant Society Journal'' 105: 6–13.

Carnivorous plants of Asia
anipahan
Endemic flora of the Philippines
Flora of Palawan
Undescribed plant species